Hattytown Tales is a 39-episode stop motion children's television series produced by FilmFair for Thames Television. It aired in the United Kingdom between 1969 and 1973. Creator and writer Keith Chatfield narrated the series, and Ivor Wood directed it. Books were published by World Distributors and it was featured in the Playland Comic (offshoot of Pippin) published by Polystyle Publications and in children's annuals for 10 years.

The residents of Hattytown were anthropomorphic hats. The style of hat each character was indicated its ethnicity, attitude, and role in Hattytown society. For instance, Bobby, the constable, resembles the hat of a constable. Buildings in the town are also hat-shaped; each building's form suggests either its primary function or resident.

The main character, Sancho, is a Mexican sombrero with legs and eyes. Carrots, his best friend, is a donkey with a carrot dangling in front of his face. In one episode, an angry bird makes its nest in Sancho's car. Every time the Hattytown residents try to move the bird, it snaps at them. At the end of the episode, the car door opens to reveal a nest of eggs that eventually hatch.

Episodes
Series 1 (1969)
 Mr Wimple's Breakfast Rolls
 Bobby's Flower Garden
 Carrot's Carrot
 King Ethelbert
 Milko's Day Off
 Simon's Magnifying Glass
 Going Fishing
 The Statue
 Sancho's Camera
 Posty's Old Boots
 You Cannot Please Everyone
 Wash Day
 The King's Portrait

Series 2 (1970)
 Saving Time
 Up and Away
 Creatures of Outer Space
 Almost Magic
 The Pillar Box
 The Royal Hattytown Guards
 Friendship
 The Picnic
 The Cannon
 Carrots for the Mayor
 Too Much of a Good Thing
 Hiccup Buns
 Bookworms

Series 3 (1973)
 Bobby's Security Patrol
 Mr. Bun the Master Baker 
 The Walking Pillar Box 
 The Fete 
 A Note for the Milkman 
 Sneezy Cheese 
 Mrs. Bagwash and the King 
 The Secret Tunnel 
 It Pays to Advertise 
 The Auction 
 The Telephone Box 
 A Taxi for Hire 
 Mustafer the Hedgehog

International broadcast
In the United States, Hattytown Tales was also often featured during the television programme Pinwheel on Nickelodeon.

Home releases

VHS
On 17 July 1995, Castle Communications released three videos with five episodes on each one. The copyright year on the back cover and the label is mistakenly printed as 1981 even though all 13 Series 1 episodes of Hattytown Tales were broadcast on ATV in 1969 and the first two Series 2 episodes of Hattytown Tales were broadcast on ATV in 1970.

On 14 May 2001, Contender Entertainment Group released a single video it with the first three episodes on it in its 'kult kidz' range of classic children's shows from the 1960s, 1970s and 1980s that were released on video.

DVD

External links
Keith Chatfield's website

1969 British television series debuts
1973 British television series endings
1960s British children's television series
1970s British children's television series
British children's animated adventure television series
BBC children's television shows
English-language television shows
British stop-motion animated television series
Television series by Cookie Jar Entertainment
Television series by FilmFair
Television series by DHX Media
Hats
1960s British animated television series
1970s British animated television series